V. montana may refer to:

Vachellia montana, legume of the family Fabaceae
Velleia montana, plant of the family Goodeniaceae
Vernicia montana, tree of the spurge family